Figueiral is a settlement in the eastern part of the island of Santo Antão, Cape Verde. In 2010 its population was 591. It is part of the municipality of Paul. It is situated in the valley of the Ribeira do Figueiral, a tributary of the Ribeira do Paul, 2 km southwest of Eito and 3 km southwest of Pombas.

See also
List of villages and settlements in Cape Verde

References

Villages and settlements in Santo Antão, Cape Verde
Paul, Cape Verde